Úlfarsfell is a mountain in the municipality of Mosfellsbær in the Reykjavík metropolitan area. It is 296 meters high. The mountain slopes have been subject to extensive forestry.

Úlfarsfell is mentioned in the written work Hítardalsbók from 1367 and in the land registry from 1704 by Árni Magnússon and Páll Vídalín. The name of the mountain, and the nearby river Úlfarsá, likely comes from a settler named Úlfar, which was born by at least four settlers according to Landnáma, the book of settlers.

References 

Mountains of Iceland